The 176th Street station is a local station on the IRT Jerome Avenue Line of the New York City Subway. Located at the intersection of 176th Street and Jerome Avenue in the Bronx, it is served by the 4 train at all times. This station was constructed by the Interborough Rapid Transit Company as part of the Dual Contracts and opened in 1917.

History 

The Dual Contracts, which were signed on March 19, 1913, were contracts for the construction and/or rehabilitation and operation of rapid transit lines in the City of New York. The contracts were "dual" in that they were signed between the City and two separate private companies (the Interborough Rapid Transit Company and the Brooklyn Rapid Transit Company), all working together to make the construction of the Dual Contracts possible. The Dual Contracts promised the construction of several lines in the Bronx. As part of Contract 3, the IRT agreed to build an elevated line along Jerome Avenue in the Bronx.

176th Street station opened as part of the initial section of the line to Kingsbridge Road on June 2, 1917. Service was initially operated as a shuttle between Kingsbridge Road and 149th Street. Through service to the IRT Lexington Avenue Line began on July 17, 1918. The line was completed with a final extension to Woodlawn on April 15, 1918. This section was initially served by shuttle service, with passengers transferring at 167th Street. The construction of the line encouraged development along Jerome Avenue, and led to the growth of the surrounding communities. The city government took over the IRT's operations on June 12, 1940.

On July 5, 2004, this station, 170th Street, and Fordham Road closed for four months so they could be renovated. As part of the project, new canopy roofs, walls, lighting, staircases, floors, and a public address system would be installed at each station.

Station layout

This elevated station has three tracks with two side platforms. The 4 stops here at all times.

The station has old style signs painted over and covered up with new style signs, and features new fare control railings as a crossunder.

The 2006 artwork here is called Reaching Out For Each Other by Juan Sánchez. It features stained glass windows on the platform windscreens and station house that each feature a hand as a central element to depict their use as a universal language.

Exits
The fare control is in a mezzanine below the tracks. Outside fare control, stairs lead to either southwest corner of Jerome Avenue and 176th Street.

References

External links 

 
 nycsubway.org — Reaching Out For Each Other Artwork by Juan Sanchez (2006)
 Station Reporter — 4 Train
 The Subway Nut — 176th Street Pictures 
 MTA's Arts For Transit — 176th Street (IRT Jerome Avenue Line)
 176th Street entrance from Google Maps Street View
Platforms from Google Maps Street View

IRT Jerome Avenue Line stations
New York City Subway stations in the Bronx
Railway stations in the United States opened in 1917
1917 establishments in New York City
Morris Heights, Bronx